Ambaria is a rock in the Meteora rock formation complex of Thessaly, Greece.

Ambaria has cave hermitages formerly inhabited by Orthodox Christian ascetics. The Panagia Monastery was likely located at Ambaria.

Access
Ambaria has about 10 small caves that are used as sheep stables. Visitors can climb directly to the caves from the main asphalt road bordering the western side of the rock.

References

Rocks of Meteora